Ethalia rufula is a species of sea snail, a marine gastropod mollusk in the family Trochidae, the top snails.

Description
The height of the shell attains 4 mm, its diameter 6 mm. The small, polished shell has a lenticular shape. It shows almost square bright spots at the periphery and near the suture, and also red angular lines. The shell contains six slightly convex whorls with deep sutures. The base of the shell is reticulated rust-colored. The broad umbilicus has a colored margin. The aperture has an angular shape. The columellar callus is thin.

Distribution
This marine species occurs off Japan.

References

 Higo, S., Callomon, P. & Goto, Y. (1999) Catalogue and Bibliography of the Marine Shell-Bearing Mollusca of Japan. Elle Scientific Publications, Yao, Japan, 749 pp.

External links
 To World Register of Marine Species

rufula
Gastropods described in 1861